Sallertaine is a commune in the Vendée department in the Pays de la Loire region in western France.

Apart from the two historical churches, the village is well known as an arts and crafts community due to the number of independent craftsmen and women who occupy various outlets, often in former homes, during the summer months. These range from potters and painters to jewellers and purveyors of fine, local foods. There is also a bread making museum that uses multi-lingual audio-commentary to illustrate how French artisan bakers make their famous products. It is possible for visitors to try their hand at bread making. On several evenings during the summer the village has live entertainment attracting French and foreign visitors. The village is also a centre for canoe hire from where the local salt marshes can be explored, including guided tours.

See also
Communes of the Vendée department

References

Communes of Vendée